, called  in French, is a buckwheat pancake in Breton cuisine.

According to legend, the buckwheat pancake was born thanks to a Breton woman spilling buckwheat slop on a hot pebble in the chimney. Small quantities of buckwheat pollen have been found in the peat lands of Brittany that date to the 12th century.

Buckwheat agriculture appeared in Brittany at the beginning of the 16th century: its output is irregular and low, but it was not taxed. Buckwheat grows on poor, infertile land and can be harvested three months after sowing, giving the nickname "the 100 days plant". Among many legends about Anne of Brittany, it is said that she developed its agriculture. Currently, the local production of buckwheat cannot supply the 15000 tons consumed per year in France, the preparation of these buckwheat pancakes relies on imports from China, Poland and Canada. A "protected geographic indicator" exists for Breton buckwheat flour and the "Blé noir tradition Bretagne" society consists of more than 800 producers and around ten mills in order to promote buckwheat flour usage (4000 tons per year).

See also 
 Blini – Eastern European thicker buckwheat pancake
 Galette
 List of buckwheat dishes
 Memil-buchimgae – Korean buckwheat pancake

References

Pancakes
Buckwheat dishes
Breton cuisine